1986 in sports describes the year's events in world sport.

Alpine skiing
 Alpine Skiing World Cup –
 Men's overall season champion: Marc Girardelli, Luxembourg
 Women's overall season champion: Maria Walliser, Switzerland

American football
 Super Bowl XX – the Chicago Bears (NFC) won 46–10 over the New England Patriots (AFC)
Location: Superdome
Attendance: 73,818
MVP: Richard Dent, DE (Chicago)
 Linebacker Lawrence Taylor of the New York Giants is named NFL Most Valuable Player Award
 January 1 – Orange Bowl (1985 season):
 The Oklahoma Sooners won 25-10 over the Penn State Nittany Lions to win the national championship
 Quarterback Vinny Testaverde of the Miami Hurricanes is awarded the Heisman Trophy

Association football
 1986 FIFA World Cup – In the final,  Argentina defeated West Germany 3–2 and won their second World Cup title. It was played for the second time in Mexico City, Azteca Stadium.
 UEFA Champions League – Steaua București 0-0 F.C. Barcelona; Steaua București won 2-0 on penalties
 UEFA Cup –Two legs; 1st leg Real Madrid C.F. 5-1 1. FC Köln; 2nd leg 1.FC Köln 2-0 Real Madrid CF. Real Madrid CF won 5-3 on aggregate
 Cup Winners' Cup – Dinamo Kiev 3-0 Atlético Madrid
 Super Cup – Steaua București 1-0 Dinamo Kiev
 Copa Libertadores de América – Two legs; 1st leg América de Cali 1-2 River Plate; 2nd leg River Plate 1-0 América. River Plate won 3-1 on aggregate
 November 6 – Alex Ferguson is appointed manager of Manchester United F.C.
 Milk Cup Final held at Wembley Stadium – Oxford United 3-0 QPR
 Intercontinental Cup – River Plate 1-0 Steaua București

Australian rules football
 Victorian Football League
 Hawthorn wins the 90th VFL Premiership (Hawthorn 16.14 (110) d Carlton 9.14 (68))
 Brownlow Medal awarded to Greg Williams (Sydney Swans) and Robert DiPierdomenico (Hawthorn)
 The national draft is held for the first time.

Baseball
 Major League Baseball
 American League defeats the National League 3-2 in the 1986 Major League Baseball All-Star Game played in Houston, Texas. Roger Clemens of the Boston Red Sox is named the game's Most Valuable Player.
 All-Star Game: American League Manager Dick Howser is diagnosed with brain cancer after mixing up signals during the game.
 Dave Righetti saves 46 games for the New York Yankees, breaking a record shared by Dan Quisenberry and Bruce Sutter.
 October 27 – World Series –  The New York Mets win 4 games to 3 over the Boston Red Sox.  The series is best remembered for Game 6, when the Red Sox were one out away from the Series victory but blew a 2-run lead with the bases empty and 2 outs in the bottom of the 10th inning; the game's final play was a groundball that rolled through the legs of first baseman Bill Buckner.
Jeff King of the University of Arkansas is the #1 overall pick in the 1986 MLB draft selected by the Pittsburgh Pirates
Arizona Wildcats defeat Florida State Seminoles 10-2 in College World Series

Basketball
 NCAA Men's Basketball Championship –
 Louisville Cardinals wins 72-69 over Duke Blue Devils
 Duke Blue Devils Guard Johnny Dawkins is named Naismith College Player of the Year
 NBA Finals
 June – Boston Celtics win 4 games to 2 over the Houston Rockets
 Boston Celtics Forward Larry Bird is awarded NBA Most Valuable Player Award
 National Basketball League (Australia) Finals:
 Adelaide 36ers defeated the Brisbane Bullets 2-1 in the best-of-three final series.
 FIBA World Championship
 United States World Champion

Boxing
 March 10 in Las Vegas, Nevada – Marvin Hagler retains the World Middleweight Championship with an 11th-round knockout of John Mugabi.
 May 8 to 18 – Fourth World Amateur Boxing Championships are held in Reno, United States
 November 22 – Mike Tyson knocks out Trevor Berbick in round 2 to become the youngest world heavyweight-boxing champion at 20 years and 4 months old

Canadian football
 Grey Cup – Hamilton Tiger-Cats won 39–15 over the Edmonton Eskimos
 Vanier Cup – UBC Thunderbirds won 25–23 over the Western Ontario Mustangs

Cycling
 Giro d'Italia won by Roberto Visentini of Italy
 Tour de France – Greg LeMond is the first winner from the United States
 UCI Road World Championships – Men's road race – Moreno Argentin of Italy

Dogsled racing
 Iditarod Trail Sled Dog Race Champion –
 Susan Butcher won with lead dogs: Granite & Mattie

Field hockey
 Men's World Cup held in London won by Australia
 Women's World Cup held in Amstelveen won by the Netherlands
 Men's Champions Trophy held in Karachi won by West Germany

Figure skating
 World Figure Skating Championships –
 Men's champion: Brian Boitano, United States
 Ladies' champion: Debi Thomas, United States
 Pair skating champions: Ekaterina Gordeeva / Sergei Grinkov, Soviet Union
 Ice dancing champions: Natalia Bestemianova / Andrei Bukin, Soviet Union

Gaelic Athletic Association
 Camogie
 All-Ireland Camogie Champion: Kilkenny
 National Camogie League: Cork
 Gaelic football
 All-Ireland Senior Football Championship – Kerry 2-15 died Tyrone 1-10
 National Football League – Laois 2-6 died Monaghan 2-5
 Ladies' Gaelic football
 All-Ireland Senior Football Champion: Kerry
 National Football League: Wexford
 Hurling
 All-Ireland Senior Hurling Championship – Cork 4-13 died Galway 2-15
 National Hurling League – Kilkenny 2–10 beat Galway 2–6

General
17 October – The IOC votes that the 1992 Olympic Summer Games will be held in Barcelona, Spain.

Golf
Men's professional
 Masters Tournament – Jack Nicklaus becomes the oldest Masters winner (age 46), and wins his last major golf championship (excluding the Senior PGA Tour).
 U.S. Open – Raymond Floyd
 British Open – Greg Norman
 PGA Championship – Bob Tway
 PGA Tour money leader – Greg Norman – $653,296
 Senior PGA Tour money leader – Bruce Crampton – $454,299
Men's amateur
 British Amateur – David Curry
 U.S. Amateur – Buddy Alexander
 European Amateur – Anders Haglund
Women's professional
 Nabisco Dinah Shore – Pat Bradley
 LPGA Championship – Pat Bradley
 U.S. Women's Open – Jane Geddes
 Classique du Maurier Classic – Pat Bradley
 LPGA Tour money leader – Pat Bradley – $492,021

Harness racing
 North America Cup – Quite A Sensation
 United States Pacing Triple Crown races –
 Cane Pace – Barberry Spur
 Little Brown Jug – Barberry Spur
 Messenger Stakes – Amity Chef
 United States Trotting Triple Crown races –
 Hambletonian – Nuclear Kosmos
 Yonkers Trot – Gunslinger Spur
 Kentucky Futurity – Sugarcane Hanover
 Australian Inter Dominion Harness Racing Championship –
 Pacers: Village Kid

Horse racing
Steeplechases
 Cheltenham Gold Cup – Dawn Run
 Grand National – West Tip
Flat races
 Australia – Melbourne Cup won by At Talaq
 Canada – Queen's Plate won by Golden Choice
 France – Prix de l'Arc de Triomphe won by Dancing Brave
 Ireland – Irish Derby Stakes won by Shahrastani
 Japan – Japan Cup won by Jupiter Island
 English Triple Crown Races:
 2,000 Guineas Stakes – Dancing Brave
 The Derby – Shahrastani
 St. Leger Stakes – Moon Madness
 United States Triple Crown Races:
 Kentucky Derby – Ferdinand
 Preakness Stakes – Snow Chief
 Belmont Stakes – Danzig Connection
 Breeders' Cup World Thoroughbred Championships:
 Breeders' Cup Classic – Skywalker
 Breeders' Cup Distaff – Lady's Secret
 Breeders' Cup Juvenile – Capote
 Breeders' Cup Juvenile Fillies – Brave Raj
 Breeders' Cup Mile – Last Tycoon
 Breeders' Cup Sprint – Smile
 Breeders' Cup Turf – Manila

Ice hockey
 Art Ross Trophy as the NHL's leading scorer during the regular season: Wayne Gretzky, Edmonton Oilers
 Hart Memorial Trophy for the NHL's Most Valuable Player: Wayne Gretzky, Edmonton Oilers
 Stanley Cup – Montreal Canadiens won 4 games to 1 over the Calgary Flames
 World Hockey Championship –
 Men's champion: Soviet Union defeated Sweden
 Junior Men's champion: Soviet Union defeated Canada

Lacrosse
 The 5th World Lacrosse Championship is held in Toronto. The United States win, and Canada is the runner-up.
 The first Japanese lacrosse team is formed at Keio University.
 The Major Indoor Lacrosse League (MILL) is formed as the Eagle Pro Box Lacrosse League.
 The New Westminster Salmonbellies win the Mann Cup.
 Mississauga wins the Founders Cup.
 The Peterborough Maulers win the Minto Cup.

Motorsport

Radiosport
 Third Amateur Radio Direction Finding World Championship held in Sarajevo, Yugoslavia.

Rugby league
1986 Kangaroo tour of Great Britain and France
1986 National Panasonic Cup
1986 New Zealand rugby league season
1986 NSWRL season
1986 Pacific Cup
1986–87 Rugby Football League season / 1985–86 Rugby Football League season
1986 State of Origin series
1985–1988 Rugby League World Cup

Rugby union
 92nd Five Nations Championship series is shared by France and Scotland

Snooker
 World Snooker Championship – Joe Johnson beats Steve Davis 18-12
 World rankings – Steve Davis remains world number one for 1986/87

Swimming
 The fifth FINA World Championships held in Madrid, Spain
 June 26 – Matt Biondi clocks 22.33 to take the world record from fellow American Tom Jager (22.40) in the 50m freestyle (long course)

Tennis
 Grand Slam in tennis men's results:
 Australian Open – no tournament held
 French Open – Ivan Lendl
 Wimbledon championships – Boris Becker
 U.S. Open – Ivan Lendl
 Grand Slam in tennis women's results:
 Australian Open – no tournament held
 French Open – Chris Evert
 Wimbledon championships – Martina Navratilova
 U.S. Open – Martina Navratilova
 Davis Cup – Australia won 3-2 over Sweden in world tennis.

Volleyball
 Men's World Championship held in Paris won by USA
 Women's World Championship held in Prague won by China

Water polo
 Men's World Championship held in Madrid won by Yugoslavia
 Women's World Championship held in Madrid won by Australia

Multi-sport events
 Asian Games held in Seoul, South Korea
 Winter Asian Games held in Sapporo, Japan
 Central American and Caribbean Games held in Santiago de los Caballeros, Dominican Republic
 Commonwealth Games held in Edinburgh, Scotland
 Summer Goodwill Games held in Moscow, Soviet Union

Awards
 ABC Wide World of Sports Athlete of the Year - Debi Thomas, Figure Skating
 Associated Press Male Athlete of the Year – Larry Bird, NBA Finals NBA basketball
 Associated Press Female Athlete of the Year – Martina Navratilova, Tennis
 Joe Paterno is named Sports Illustrated Sportsman of the Year

References

 
Sports by year